Uneme is an Edoid language and sub-saharan group of Nigeria located in the Edo State.

References

Edoid languages